Connie McBooker was an American blues pianist based in Houston, Texas, United States.

McBooker worked with such artists as B.B. King, Hank Ballard, Junior Parker, Cal Green, and L.C. Williams.  Most of his work was as a session performer, but he also had some solo works, most notably "Shout Baby Boogie."

"Shout Baby Boogie" was on two compilation albums.  One was Boogie Woogie Blues of the 1940s and 1950s, which also had songs by, among others, Lightnin' Hopkins and Professor Longhair.  The other is The Real Blues Brothers, which was sold throughout the world, but did especially well in Germany.  The title was inspired by the 1980 movie The Blues Brothers, which starred Dan Aykroyd and John Belushi.

McBooker is presumed dead, but no one has been able to confirm this.

External links
Information page
Information on Blues d'Azur album on which he worked with B.B. King

American blues pianists
Year of birth missing
Possibly living people
American male pianists